China Jianyin Investment Co., Ltd. (JIC) is a Chinese investment company owned by the government of the People's Republic of China. Founded in 2004, it is a wholly owned subsidiary of Central Huijin Investment and is an integrated investment group focused on equity investments.  The group is headquartered in Beijing and owns more than 160 wholly owned or holding enterprises and institutions in 29 Chinese provinces, autonomous regions, municipalities and Hong Kong SAR. It has also established affiliated agencies in Europe.

Businesses

Investment

Portfolio 
SGD Pharma, manufacturer of primary glass packaging and containers for the pharmaceutical industry

Miquel Alimentació Group, a Spanish company specializing in food wholesale, franchising and supply chain management

Pacoma GmbH, one of Europe's suppliers of hydraulic cylinders

NXP

CRCC High-tech Equipment, China's largest railway track maintenance machinery supplier

Dali Foods Group, a snack foods & beverage company in China

Zoomlion

Shanghai Rural Commercial Bank

CCB Life Insurance

JAC Motors

HaiLin Energy Technology Inc., a supplier for AC control, heating control, solar thermal system and green homebuilding

Industrial operations

Asset management 
JIC Trust Co., Ltd.

Guotai Asset Management Co., Ltd.

JIC Leasing Co., Ltd.

China Investment Consulting Co., Ltd.

References

Financial services companies of China
Companies based in Beijing
Chinese companies established in 2004
China Investment Corporation
Government-owned companies of China